The Regions Plaza is a high-rise office building in Jackson, Mississippi, United States. It was designed in the modernist architectural style, and it was completed in 1975. It is the tallest building in Jackson. As of 2015, it is owned by the Hertz Investment Group, chaired by Judah Hertz.

References

Skyscraper office buildings in Jackson, Mississippi
Office buildings completed in 1975
Modernist architecture in Mississippi